Grey Eagle was a wooden sternwheel-driven steamboat that operated on the Willamette and Yamhill rivers in the United States from 1894 to 1930.  In 1903 Grey Eagle became the last commercial steamboat to run upriver to Junction City, Oregon.

Design and construction
Grey Eagle (also seen spelled Gray Eagle) was built on the Yamhill River at Newberg, Oregon in 1894 for the shipping firm of Fuller, Kemp & Cook. The steamboat was driven by a sternwheel which was turned by two twin horizontally mounted high-pressure steam engines. Grey Eagle'''s original steamboat registry number was 86300.

OperationsGrey Eagle was used to tow logs in the Salem area in the late 1890s.  In 1903, under Capt. Arthur Riggs, Grey Eagle became the last commercial steamboat to run up the Willamette River to the landing at Junction City, Oregon.  After this, aside from an occasional log tow, no steamboat operated any further upriver than Corvallis.

In 1907, Grey Eagle was rebuilt into a towboat at Salem by M. J. Jones for Salem Towing & Transportation Co.  The vessel was smaller following the rebuild, at 154 gross and 141 registered tons.  The post-rebuild official registry number was 204891. In the late 1920s, the vessel was operated by the Charles K. Spaulding Logging Co. in towing work on the Willamette in the Salem area.

DispositionGrey Eagle was abandoned in 1930.

Notes

References
 Affleck, Edward L., A Century of Paddlewheelers in the Pacific Northwest, the Yukon, and Alaska, Alexander Nicholls Press, Vancouver, BC 2000 
 
 Mills, Randall V., Sternwheelers up Columbia -- A Century of Steamboating in the Oregon Country, University of Nebraska, Lincoln NE 1947 (1977 printing by Bison Press) 
 Newell, Gordon R. ed., H. W. McCurdy Marine History of the Pacific Northwest'',  Superior Publishing, Seattle WA (1966)

Steamboats of Oregon
Steamboats of the Willamette River
Passenger ships of the United States
Ships built in Oregon
1890 ships